The Tabriziha Mosque is a historical mosque in Kashan, Iran. The mosque is located in Malek bazarche and belongs to the Qajar era. It was built by Mohammad Hosseyn Tabrizi. Both sides of its big door have been decorated with haftrang tiles. Its vestibule has a stucco inscription. The ceiling of its shabestan has 18 arches, which have been decorated with bricks and tiles. The columns have been covered with tiles. The four sides of shabestan and around the columns there are inscriptions of the verses of Koran. The inscriptions have been written in white Naskh on a persian blue background. The triangle under the inscriptions have been decorated with designs and shapes. The mihrab of the mosque has been decorated with tiles and has a stucco inscription. On the inscription, some Koran verses have been written in white Thuluth script on the ultramarine background.

See also 
List of the historical structures in the Isfahan province

References 

Mosques in Isfahan Province
Buildings and structures in Kashan